Thermal lag describes a body's temperature with respect to time as a result of its thermal mass. A body with high thermal mass (high heat capacity and low conductivity) will have a large thermal lag. 

 

Examples

The slow night-time cooling of a home after its external brick wall has been heated by the sun is one example of thermal lag.  Thermal lag is the reason the high temperatures in summer continue to increase after the summer solstice (in this case, it is termed seasonal lag), and it is the reason a day's high temperature peaks in the afternoon instead of when the Sun is at its peak (12 noon).

See also
 Heat transfer
 Stokes boundary layer

References

Heat transfer